Cafuné is an American indie pop duo consisting of singer-songwriter Sedona Schat and producer Noah Yoo. It was founded in 2014 after the two met at New York University. Their single "Tek It" from their 2021 debut album, Running, went viral on TikTok in 2022, and they were soon signed to Elektra Records that same year.

History
Noah Yoo was raised in Fairfax, Virginia, where he grew up playing violin and eventually playing guitar in high school bands. He and Sedona Schat both began attending the Clive Davis Institute at New York University in 2012, where the two met and bonded over their appreciation of Two Door Cinema Club. In their sophomore year, Yoo worked on one of Schat's songs, and Cafuné was started as a side project for both of them the following year when Yoo briefly lived with Schat. Yoo also worked as a staffer for Pitchfork. Both Yoo and Schat attended a Masterclass session with Pharrell Williams among other selected CDI students held in the New York University Tisch School of the Arts in 2016.

Cafuné released their debut single, "Letting Go", in 2014. They released their debut EP, Love Songs for Other People, in 2015. Running, their debut album, was written and produced by the duo at their homes over several years, recorded throughout the COVID-19 pandemic in 2020, and released on July 20, 2021 through their own label, Aurelians Club. The song reconsider was mixed by Kyle Pulley at Headroom Studios.  The album featured the singles "High", "Want Me Out", and "Tek It", the last of which went viral on TikTok in early 2022 due to its use in anime edits and other trends on the platform, which prompted Elektra Records to sign the duo in June 2022. They opened for Chvrches on their summer 2022 tour.

Musical style
Cafuné's music has been described as alt-pop, indie pop, dream pop, and indie rock. Their earlier music was electropop and synth-pop, and their music became more rock-oriented after they played at various college shows.

Discography

Studio albums

Extended plays

Singles

References

American indie pop groups
American musical duos
American pop music duos
Rock music duos
American indie rock groups
Electropop groups
American synth-pop groups
Male–female musical duos
Musical groups established in 2014
Dream pop musical groups
Musical groups from Brooklyn
2014 establishments in New York City